Symphony No. 5 in D major by the English composer Ralph Vaughan Williams was written between 1938 and 1943. In style it represents a shift away from the violent dissonance of his Fourth Symphony, and a return to the gentler style of the earlier Pastoral Symphony.

Many of the musical themes in the Fifth Symphony stem from Vaughan Williams's then-unfinished operatic work, The Pilgrim's Progress. This opera, or "morality" as Vaughan Williams preferred to call it, had been in gestation for decades, and the composer had temporarily abandoned it at the time the symphony was conceived. Despite its origins, the symphony is without programmatic content.

The work was an immediate success at its premiere in 1943, and is frequently performed in concert and on record.

History

Background
In 1935 Vaughan Williams had caused surprise and even shock with his Fourth Symphony,  a strident and dissonant piece in great contrast with its quiet and contemplative predecessor, A Pastoral Symphony (1922). After this he experienced a temporary writer's block, before he began writing his Fifth Symphony in 1938. He had been working intermittently for more than thirty years on what became his opera (or "Morality") The Pilgrim's Progress. Believing that the opera might never be completed he decided to incorporate some of its ideas and themes into other works, most notably the Fifth Symphony.

The symphony was complete enough by the end of 1942 for the composer to prepare a two-piano transcription, which two friends played for him in late January 1943. Any doubts he had about the piece were allayed when he heard the first orchestral run-through on 25 May. He found that the symphony said what he meant it to.

Vaughan Williams dedicated the symphony to Jean Sibelius. The musicologist J. P. E. Harper-Scott has called Sibelius "the influence of choice" among British symphonists in the years between the two World Wars, citing Walton's First Symphony, all seven of Bax's and the first five of Havergal Brian. The published ascription reads "Dedicated without permission to Jean Sibelius". Sir Adrian Boult subsequently secured permission. After listening to a broadcast of the work, Sibelius wrote to him, "I heard Dr. Ralph Vaughan Williams' new Symphony from Stockholm under the excellent leadership of Malcolm Sargent ... This Symphony is a marvellous work ... the dedication made me feel proud and grateful ... I wonder if Dr. Williams has any idea of the pleasure he has given me?"

Composition
The symphony is scored for two flutes (one doubling piccolo), oboe, cor anglais, two clarinets, two bassoons, two French horns, two trumpets, three trombones, timpani and strings. This is a smaller orchestra than Vaughan Williams used in his four earlier symphonies, with only two horns, no tuba, no harps and no percussion except timpani. The symphony is in the customary four-movement form. The composer provided metronome markings for all four movements, but they are widely regarded as dubious: the composer did not observe them when he conducted the work, and he expressed approval of Boult's tempi, which were similar to his own. His musical assistant Roy Douglas has suggested that Vaughan Williams simply miscalculated because he did not possess a metronome.

In addition to the Pilgrim's Progress allusions, the score has echoes of Vaughan Williams's hymn tune "Sine nomine", in the second subject of the first movement and at the end of the fourth movement.

I: Preludio
The first movement, in Frank Howes's analysis (1954), can be seen either as "an elaborate ternary form with coda" or "an exposition of two big groups of themes succeeded without development by a condensed recapitulation". This movement owes something to sonata form, but does not display all its characteristics; the second subject has been derived from the first subject. The movement opens with a pedal C in the bass, answered by a horn call outlining a D major chord in a dotted rhythm, which implies mixolydian D.  The violins use the notes of the pentatonic scale, making the key ambiguous. Wilfrid Mellers believes this is why Vaughan Williams billed the movement as a Preludio, "which suggests an emergent state". The horn call motif fluctuates from major to minor, outlining the tonal ambiguity, moving between the mixolydian and dorian modes, which becomes a characteristic of the movement. The bass's C pedal becomes the tonic when the key changes to either the aeolian or dorian modes. The modality then moves to E, with a new melody in the violins, which, although it does not include a sharpened seventh, outlines E major. The bass, now played pizzicato, supports the melody both melodically and harmonically and the texture incorporates suspensions and passing notes, making the harmony richer. A sudden descent of a semitone, an idea previously used in Vaughan Williams's works Fantasia on a Theme by Thomas Tallis and Job, marks a key change to three flats and also the development section.

The tempo accelerates to allegro for the development. The strings are used to imply the winds of nature, in a similar vein to that of Sibelius. This is punctuated by the brass and woodwind with the falling semitone motif, which gets larger intervallically to a major second and then a minor third. This section is a canon; the polyphony of which Mellers believes shows the randomness of nature. The key shifts down mediants, until it reaches D minor, when the strings imitate Sibelius again, this time using tremolo effects.

For the recapitulation the tempo slows and the dynamics are reduced. The C pedal is reintroduced, but this time in a more melodic fashion. There is more development in the recapitulation. The movement ends in a similar way to the opening, with the horn call, but the key signature of two flats rather than one sharp is used. The bases descend to C via E, leaving the tonality of the movement still in question.

Arnold Whittall argues that "With respect to D Major, the Preludio might be regarded as a clear case of Schoenbergian 'Schwebende Tonalität' ('fluctuating: suspended, not yet decided' tonality)", although Vaughan Williams stated that Schoenberg's music meant nothing to him.

II: Scherzo
Vaughan Williams uses rhythm in the Scherzo to convey different effects. The focus of the movement is centred on the rhythm rather than the ambiguous tonality of the Preludio. Lionel Pike comments that "at times it seems more like a counterpoint of rhythms than of pitches." The movement begins with three dotted minims in a fast 3/4 time (dotted minim = 120), and then minims for four bars, which create hemiolas and then crotchets. This gives the illusion that the music is accelerating, and so the pulse does not settle. When the melodic line begins, the music is divided into five bar phrases. A sense of stability is established when the theme is repeated by the viola and double bass in stable two bar phrases. However the violins enter with phrasing that does not conform to either pattern, thus adding more confusion. Using this rhythmic phrasing, the dorian line played on the violins and the aeolian woodwind line are differentiated rhythmically, as well as tonally. The rhythmical confusion is halted when the wind and strings alternate downward runs antiphonally.

III: Romanza
In the manuscript score Vaughan Williams headed this movement with words taken from Bunyan:
  Upon that place there stood a cross
  And a little below a sepulchre … Then he said
  "He hath given me rest by his sorrow and
  Life by his death"Connock, Stephen (1998). Notes to Chandos CD set CHAN 9625
The third and fourth lines were later sung in the opera by Pilgrim. The inscription was omitted from the published score in accordance with the composer's wish that the symphony should be regarded as absolute music. The movement may be considered the spiritual core of the work: Frank Howes calls it "the heart of the symphony" and David Cox calls it "a profound meditation on the three main musical elements presented at the outset". It is not clear why the composer called it "Romanza". Howes comments that with its spiritual, meditative nature there is nothing "romantic" about this movement; Michael Kennedy observes that with Vaughan Williams the term "is always a signal that the music was of special significance to him".

The opening cor anglais solo is taken virtually without change.  Rising fourths again appear as connecting passages.

IV: Passacaglia

Although this movement begins with the repetitive bass line characteristic of the passacaglia form, Vaughan Williams eventually abandons it. The triumphant primary melody of the passacaglia is used as Pilgrim's dialogue with Interpreter in the second half of "The House Beautiful" scene, while the fanfare motif recalls of "The Arming of the Pilgrim" in Act II Scene 1. This ushers in a return of the themes from the first movement of the symphony, which are resolved into a quiet valediction played first by the woodwind and then by the upper strings.

Premieres and publication
The Fifth Symphony was premiered on 24 June 1943 at a Prom concert in the Royal Albert Hall, London, by the London Philharmonic Orchestra conducted by the composer. Sir Henry Wood, the founder and presiding figure of the Proms, was originally intended to conduct the performance but was not well enough and the composer was persuaded to take the baton. The American premiere was given in Carnegie Hall on 30 November 1944 by the New York Philharmonic under Artur Rodziński.

The score of the symphony was published by Oxford University Press (OUP) in 1946. Vaughan Williams lightly revised the score in 1951, but that revision was not published during his lifetime. It was published in 1961, re-engraved with corrections in 1969, and in 2008 OUP issued a new edition, edited by Peter Horton, to commemorate the 50th anniversary of the composer's death.

Reception
In a survey of Vaughan Williams's nine symphonies, Elliott Schwartz writes:

Hubert Foss comments that public appreciation of the symphony "was more immediate than that of perhaps any other single work by the composer".

The response of music critics was generally enthusiastic. The anonymous reviewer in The Times wrote that the symphony "belongs to that small body of music that, outside of late Beethoven, can properly be described as transcendental … this is music not only of contemplation but of benediction". A grudging note was struck by William Glock, a proponent of avant-garde music, who commented in The Observer that the symphony was "like the work of a distinguished poet who has nothing very new to say, but says it in exquisitely flowing language". Neville Cardus wrote, "The Fifth Symphony contains the most benedictory and consoling music of our time." When the first recording came out in 1944 (see below) The Observer was more welcoming than Glock had been the year before, saying that the Fifth was to the Fourth Symphony as The Tempest is to King Lear … ideal beauty."

After its premiere at a Prom concert in June 1943, the symphony was given in each of the following four seasons, conducted by Boult (1944 and 1947) and Basil Cameron (1945 and 1946). Seventeen further performances were given in subsequent Prom seasons between 1949 and 2012. In 1994 the composer Anthony Payne wrote of the symphony:

Recordings
The symphony was first recorded within a year of the premiere, under the auspices of the British Council. More than thirty recordings have been issued subsequently.

Notes, references and sources

Notes

References

Sources

Further reading
Dickinson, A.E.F. (February 1945). "Vaughan Williams's Fifth Symphony." The Music Review, vol. 6, no. 1, pp. 1-12. 
Dineen, Murray (2003). "Vaughan Williams's Fifth Symphony: Ideology and Aural Tradition." In Byron Adams and Robin Wells, eds., Vaughan Williams Essays (Ashgate), pp. 17-27. 
Douglas, Roy (January 1963). "Vaughan Williams and His Fifth Symphony." Record Times, vol. 5, no. 12, p. 2. 
Foss, Hubert (August 1950). "Vaughan Williams's D Major Symphony." Hallé, no. 27, pp. 12-15.
Ottaway, Hugh (October 1953). "Vaughan Williams: Symphony in D and ' The Pilgrim's Progress '. A Comparative Note." The Musical Times, vol. 94, no. 1328, pp. 456-458. 
Ottaway, Hugh (May 1964). "VW 5—A New Analysis." The Musical Times, vol. 105, no. 1455, pp. 354-356. 

Symphony 005
1943 compositions
Compositions in D major